Farge is a small village in the borough Blumenthal of Bremen, Germany. It is located at the river Weser.

The bombing of Bremen in World War II attacked Farge targets, including the oil storage.

The Farge concentration camp is located nearby in the village Schwanewede in Lower Saxony.

External links 
 Heimatverein Farge-Rekum

References

Populated places in Bremen (city)